Mixquiahuala (officially Mixquiahuala de Juárez; Otomi: Ntʼähi) is a town and one of the 84 municipalities of Hidalgo, in central-eastern Mexico. The municipal seat lies at Mixquiahuala de Juárez (municipality).  The municipality covers an area of 138.1 km².

As of 2005, the municipality had a total population of 37,747.

References

Municipalities of Hidalgo (state)
Populated places in Hidalgo (state)
Populated places in the Teotlalpan
Otomi settlements